Mark Kratzmann and Simon Youl were the defending champions but Youl did not compete.

Ricky Brown and Robbie Weiss defeated Kratzmann and Jonas Svensson in the final, 1–6, 6–4, 11–9 to win the boys' doubles tennis title at the 1984 Wimbledon Championships.

Seeds

  Mark Kratzmann /  Jonas Svensson (final)
  Luke Jensen /  Patrick McEnroe (quarterfinals)
  François Errard /  Éric Winogradsky (first round)
  Dan Nahirny /  Brad Pearce (semifinals)

Draw

Draw

References

External links

Boys' Doubles
Wimbledon Championship by year – Boys' doubles